Gôh Region is one of the 31 regions of Ivory Coast. Since its establishment in 2011, it has been one of two regions in Gôh-Djiboua District. The region's seat is Gagnoa and its area is 7327 km². At the 2021 census, the region had a population of 985,282.

History
From 2000 until the 2011 administrative reorganisation of the subdivisions of Ivory Coast, the territory that is now Gôh constituted the first-level division Fromager Region. At the reorganisation, the territory was renamed Gôh and combined with Lôh-Djiboua to form the new first-level division Gôh-Djiboua District.

Departments
Gôh Region is currently divided into two departments: Gagnoa and Oumé.

Notes

 
Regions of Gôh-Djiboua District
2011 establishments in Ivory Coast
States and territories established in 2011